Louky Bersianik (14 November 1930 – 3 December 2011) was the pen name of Lucile Durand, a French-Canadian novelist.

She studied French literature at the Université de Montréal, the Sorbonne, and the Centre d'études de radio et de télévision.

The first section of the film Firewords/Les terribles vivantes (Dorothy Todd Hénault, 1986) is dedicated to interviews with Bersianik and dramatized excerpts from L'euguélionne.

Awards
1966 - Prix de la Province, for Togo apprenti-remorqueur
1997 - Prix du Gouverneur général

Works
 L'Euguélionne: roman triptyque, La Presse, 1976, 
The Euguélionne: a triptych novel, Press Porcépic, 1981, ; Translator Howard Scott, Alter Ego Editions, 1996, 
 Le pique-nique sur l'Acropole, VLB éditeur, 1979
 La page de garde, Editions de la Maison, 1978
 Maternative: les pré-Ancyl, VLB Éditeur, 1980
Au beau milieu de moi: photographies de Kero, Nouvelle Optique, 1983
 Axes et eau: poems, VLB éditeur, 1984, 
 Kerameikos, Éditions du Noroît, 1987, 
La Théorie, un dimanche, Éditions du Remue-ménage, 1988
Femmes, corps et âme,  Musée de la civilisation, 1996 
Permafrost, 1937-1938: roman, Leméac, 1997

Essays
La Main tranchante du symbole. Éditions du Remue-ménage, 1990, 
L'archéologie du Futur, Sisyphe, 2007,

References

Further reading 
 
 Simon, Sherry. Gender in Translation. Cultural Identity and the Politics of Transmission. London: Routledge 1996. Chapter: Challenging grammatical gender

External links
 Wiki feminists: Louky Bersianik
 Archives of Louky Bersianik (Fonds Louky Bersianik, R11704) are held at Library and Archives Canada 

1930 births
2011 deaths
20th-century Canadian novelists
20th-century Canadian women writers
Canadian feminist writers
Canadian women novelists
Université de Montréal alumni
University of Paris alumni
Canadian women essayists
Writers from Montreal
20th-century Canadian essayists
Canadian expatriates in France